Sir Henry Beyer Robertson (4 May 1862 – 2 June 1948) was a British industrialist. He was the son of Henry Robertson, of Palé Hall, Llandderfel.

Born in Shrewsbury, he was the son of Henry Robertson (11 June 1816 – 22 March 1888) and Elizabeth Dean (9 December 1821 – 14 March 1892, formerly of Brymbo Hall). He was christened Henry Beyer Robertson in respect of his German-born godfather, Charles Beyer. Beyer was one of the leading locomotive designers of his day and co-founder of one of the world's largest and most famous independent locomotive manufacturers, Beyer, Peacock & Company, based in Gorton, Manchester. It was founded by three partners; Beyer, Henry Robertson, and Richard Peacock. Sir Henry would also later become a director in the firm.

He was educated at Shrewsbury School, Eton College, and Jesus College Cambridge.

Robertson served in the Royal Welsh Fusiliers from 1882 to 1883.
He was a director of the Great Western Railway. His father was the engineer of many of the railways in Wales which had been taken over by the GWR.

He was the head of Brymbo Steelworks, and during the First World War ensured maximum production of iron and steel at Brymbo for munitions. He rescued the works from bankruptcy in the 1931 following the Great Depression. He successfully negotiated a contract to supply steel to Rolls-Royce, for aero engine production, during Britain's rearming in response to Germany's growing military build up in the late 1930s. His father had rescued the original Brymbo Ironworks (founded by John Wilkinson) in the 1840s, and introduce steel-making in the 1880s.

He was knighted in 1890 in recognition of his father, who died before he could be knighted. appointed Deputy Lieutenant, and nominated for Sheriff for Merionethshire. His father had died in 1888, just prior to Queen Victoria's visit to Palé Hall in 1889, and it fell to Henry Beyer Robertson to play host.

He and his wife had seven children. They had five daughters, Jean (born 1892), Mary (born 1893), Elizabeth (born 1894), Annie (born 1895), followed by two boys, Henry (born 1897), and Duncan (born 1900).

References

1862 births
1948 deaths
Knights Bachelor